The Barbasol Championship is a professional golf tournament in Kentucky on the PGA Tour; it debuted in 2015 as an alternate event to The Open Championship in Britain in July. The first three editions of the tournament were played in Alabama at the Grand National course of the Robert Trent Jones Golf Trail in Opelika, northeast of Auburn. It was the first PGA Tour event played in Alabama since the PGA Championship 

In 2018, the tournament moved to Kentucky to the Keene Trace Golf Club in Nicholasville, south of Lexington, and was the first PGA Tour event (excluding majors) in the state in 59 years, since the Kentucky Derby Open in 1959. (Valhalla Golf Club near Louisville hosted the PGA Championship in 1996, 2000, 

Like other alternate events, the winner of the Barbasol Championship does not earn an invitation to the Masters and point values are limited due to the weaker field (24 OWGR points and 300 FedEx Cup points compared to 100 OWGR points and 600 FedEx points for Open Championship winners). However, the winner still receives a two-year PGA Tour exemption and a trip to the PGA Championship.

In August 2021, it was announced that from 2022 onward, the event would become a co-sanctioned event with the European Tour, played the same week as an alternate event to the Genesis Scottish Open. It would also be an event that would give the leading non-exempt golfer entry into The Open Championship.

Winners

Notes

References

External links

Coverage on PGA Tour's official site

PGA Tour events
European Tour events
Golf in Alabama
Golf in Kentucky
Nicholasville, Kentucky
2015 establishments in Alabama
Recurring sporting events established in 2015